Lisa Anne Johnson (born 1967) is an American diplomat and a career member of the Senior Foreign Service, serving as the deputy assistant secretary of the Bureau of International Narcotics and Law Enforcement Affairs. Johnson previously served the United States Ambassador to Namibia from 2018 to 2021 and chargé d’affaires at the U.S. Embassy in Nassau, Bahamas, from 2014 to 2017. Her overseas posts have included time at U.S. embassies in Beirut, Lebanon; Islamabad, Pakistan; Luanda, Angola; and Pretoria, South Africa. Johnson was also posted to the Office of the Secretary General of NATO in Brussels, Belgium. She has also served as a senior official at the U.S. State Department, National Security Council and Vice President's Office.

Personal life
Johnson speaks French and Portuguese.

References

1967 births
Living people
21st-century American diplomats
Ambassadors of the United States to Namibia
Ambassadors of the United States to the Bahamas
American women ambassadors
Columbia University alumni
National War College alumni
Stanford University alumni
United States Foreign Service personnel
21st-century American women
American women diplomats